The Administration of West Prussia before 1919 consisted of the following officials:

Danzig Region 

Regional Presidents of Danzig - Regierungspräsidenten von Danzig
1869–1876 — Paul Friedrich Heinrich Gustav von Diest
1876–1878 — Franz Otto Theodor von Hoffmann
1878–1879 — Heinrich Karl Julius von Achenbach 
1879–1880 — Karl Adolf August Ernst von Ernsthausen 
1881–1882 — Wilhelm A. Theodor von Wiendowski "von Saltzwedell" 
1883–1887 — Konrad Anton Robert Rothe
1887–1890 — Adolf Eduard von Heppe
1890–1902 — Friedrich Heinrich Ehrenreich
1902–1902 — Hans von Holwede
1902–1908 — Jaroslaw von Jarotzky 
1909–1918 — Lothar Foerster                                

Due to Treaty of Versailles of 1919 the Danzig Region ceased to exist and was ceded in 1920 to the Free City of Danzig, the Polish Pomeranian Voivodeship and the Prussian Province of East Prussia.

Berent County 

Supervisors/Landräte:
1853–1896 — ... Engler                       
1896–1919 — ... Trüstedt

Danzig City County 

Lord Mayors/Oberbürgermeister:
1862–1890 — Leopold von Winter               
1891–1896 — Karl Adolf von Baumbach                           
1896–1903 — Clemens G. Ernst Delbruck                            
1903–1910 — Heinrich Otto Ehlers             
1910–1918 — Heinrich Scholtz                 
1919–1920 — Heinrich Friedrich Wilhelm Martin Sahm

Danzig-Land (Rural) County 

Supervisor/Landrat:
1867–1887 - Archibald August von Gramatzki

In 1887, Kreis Danzig Land was divided into Danziger Höhe, Danziger Niederung and Dirschau.

Danziger Höhe County (created in 1887) 

Supervisors/Landräte:
1887–1904 — ... Maurach
1904–1915 — Emil Venske
1916–1919 — ... von Unger

Danziger Niederung County (created in 1887) 

Supervisors/Landräte:
1887–1895 — Archibald August von Gramatzki
1895–1919 — ... Brandt

Dirschau County (created in 1876) 

Supervisors/Landräte:
1876–1887— ... von Sanden
1887–1908 — ... Döhn
1909–1919 — ... von Kries

Elbing-Land (Rural) County 

Supervisors/Landräte:
1868–1879 — ... Bax
1879–1883 —  ... Birkner
1883–1888 — Eugen Karl Hugo Dippe
1888–1907 — Rüdiger Etzdorf
1907–1925 — Arthur Adolph Graf von Posadowski-Wehner, after 1919 only for the part that remained German

Karthaus County 

Supervisors/Landräte:
1833–1851 — Georg Kaspar Otto von Kleist
1875–1884 — Werner Freiherr von Schleinitz
1885            — Ernst Ferdinand Julius Bruno von Schwichow*
1885–1893 — ... von Krosigk
1893–1901 — ... Keller
1901–1910 — Gottfried Hagemann                 
1911–1914 — ... Römhild
1915–1919 — ... Simon

Marienburg County 

Supervisors/Landräte:
1871–1877 — Gustav Gottfried Keil
1877–1890 — ... Doehring
1890–1895 — ... von Zander
1895–1901 — ... von Glasennapp
1901–1910 — ... Freiherr Senfft von Pilsach
1910–1918 — Gottfried Hagemann               
1918–1920 — ... von Rönne*, since 1919 only for the part that remained German

Neustadt County 

Supervisors/Landräte:
1868–1879 — Friedrich Eberhard Vormbaum
1879–1881 — ... Wenzel*
1881–1893 — ... Gumprecht
1893–1907 — Robert Graf von Keyserlingk-Cammerau
1907–1919 — Theodor Christian Traugott Graf von Baudissin

Marienwerder Region 

Regional Presidents of Marienwerder - Regierungspräsidenten von Marienwerder
West Prussia

Due to Treaty of Versailles of 1919 the Marienwerder Region ceased to exist and its territory was ceded partially to the Polish Pomeranian Voivodeship and the Prussian Provinces of East Prussia and Posen-West Prussia.